Lone Hickory is an unincorporated community in southern Yadkin County, North Carolina, United States, west of Courtney. It is located on Lone Hickory road, approximately one mile southeast of the road's western terminus at U.S. Route 21.

References

Unincorporated communities in Yadkin County, North Carolina
Unincorporated communities in North Carolina